Maria Paterna (born 8 April 2000) is a Greek footballer who plays as a defender for A Division club OFI and the Greece women's national team.

Club career
Paterna has played for PAOK in Greece at the UEFA Women's Champions League.

International career
Paterna capped for Greece at senior level during the UEFA Women's Euro 2022 qualifying.

Honours
PAOK
A Division(5): 2017,2018,2019,2020,2021
Greek Cup(1): 2017

References

2000 births
Living people
Greek women's footballers
Women's association football defenders
PAOK FC (women) players
Greece women's international footballers